The  is a national expressway in Japan. It is owned and operated by Central Nippon Expressway Company.

Naming

The name  is a kanji acronym consisting of characters found in the former names of the provinces linked by the expressway.  consists of the eastern part of present-day Wakayama Prefecture, and  consists of present-day Mie Prefecture.

The expressway is officially designated as the Hanwa Expressway Kisei Route, however this designation does not appear on any signage.

Overview

The first section of the expressway was opened in 2006 (from the origin to Ōmiya-Ōdai Interchange). Another section (to Kisei-Ouchiyama Interchange) opened in 2009 and the next section (to Kii-Nagashima Interchange) opened in 2013. The expressway beyond this point is still in the planning stages and will be built according to the New Direct Control System. Under this system, the financial burden for planning and building expressways will be shared by both the national and local governments; this differs from the established system which is carried out exclusively by the national government. Expressways built under this system are also planned to be toll-free.

The route is 2 lanes for its entire length, with some overtaking areas. The speed limit is 70 km/h.

List of interchanges and features

 (IC - interchange, JCT - junction, PA - parking area, TB - toll gate, TN - tunnel, BR - bridge

Between Seiwa-Taki Junction and Owase-minami Interchange

Between Nanki-Tanabe and Susami-minami Interchanges

References

External links 
Central Nippon Expressway Company

Expressways in Japan
Proposed roads in Japan
Roads in Mie Prefecture